Armistead is both a surname and a masculine given name. Notable people with the name include:

Surname:
 Bill Armistead (born 1944), American politician from Alabama
 George Armistead (1780–1818), American military officer who served as the commander of Fort McHenry during the Battle of Baltimore in the War of 1812
 James Armistead, American slave and spy in the American Revolution
 Lewis Addison Armistead, Confederate Army general
 Samuel G. Armistead (1927–2013), American ethnographer, linguist, folklorist, historian and Hispanist
 Walker Keith Armistead, United States Army brigadier general
 Wilson Armistead, (1819–1868) British merchant, anti-slavery abolitionist and author

Given name:
 Armistead Abraham Lilly (1878–1956), American lawyer, politician, and businessperson
 Armistead Burt, U.S. Representative from South Carolina from 1843 to 1853
 Armistead Mason Dobie, legal educator and federal judge
 Armistead Maupin, American writer
 Armistead Burwell Smith IV, American musician, member of Pinback
 Armistead Thomson Mason, U.S. Senator from Virginia from 1816 to 1817
 Armistead (c. 1820–1844), slave of US President John Tyler, killed in the USS Princeton disaster

See also 
 Armistead, California, unincorporated community in Kern County
 Armistead Gardens, Baltimore
 Armstead

References 

Masculine given names
English-language surnames
English masculine given names